AtGames Cloud Holdings Inc. (formerly AtGames Digital Media Inc.) is an American video game and console manufacturer, known for their Legends Ultimate Arcade and the creator of the connected arcade. Since 2011, they have produced and marketed the Atari-licensed dedicated home video game console series Atari Flashback under license from Atari. Additionally, AtGames has produced ColecoVision and Intellivision Flashback consoles, and has worked with Sega on multiple different handhelds and retro consoles.

History 

In August 2014, GameFly announced on its website that AtGames had acquired its online games distribution service. AtGames relaunched this service under the name Direct2Drive in late 2014. In December 2014, AtGames purchased the IP to Calxeda through its subsidiary Silver Lining Systems, and was using the acquired technology to build fabric interconnects for A1100-powered servers as of January 2016.

In August 2019, AtGames acquired the royalty interest owed to General Computer Corporation's (GCC) for Ms. Pac-Man. Shortly after, Bandai Namco Entertainment sued AtGames for use of Ms. Pac-Man, on grounds of false advertising and copyright infringement. In November 2019, United States District Court Judge Vince Chhabria denied Bandai Namco's request for a preliminary injunction. In an order, Judge Chhabria ruled that,  "allegations of reputational harm fall somewhere between speculative and fanciful." On October 27, 2020, a U.S. federal court dismissed Bandai Namco's lawsuit against AtGames over IP rights in Pac-Man and Ms. Pac-Man games. In November 2020, AtGames reintroduced the Bandai Namco Arcade Blast!. 

In January 2020, AtGames announced a partnership with Taito.

In June 2020, AtGames announced a partnership with FarSight Studios in which 22 Gottlieb pinball tables from their Pinball Arcade video game would be ported over to AtGames' newest flagship, the AtGames Legends Pinball (ALP) machine. Since then, AtGames has continued its Legends line by adding consoles with arcade control decks (Legends Gamer, Core, and Legends Core Max) as well as their AtGames Legends Ultimate Mini (ALU Mini) and most recently, the AtGames Legends Pinball Micro (ALP Micro). A miniature version of the full size ALP.

AtGames has expanded the capabilities of these devices by adding more accessories, like the QuadPlay, a four-player control deck for the ALU. AtGames has also partnered with Magic Pixel Studios to port over their Zaccaria digital pinball tables as well as to develop new pinball tables taken from various intellectual properties, such as Dr. Seuss, Natural History Magazine, and Taito.

Products 

Starting in 2018, AtGames has released  HDMI dongle "Mini Console Sticks", bundled with Sega Genesis-like controllers dubbed "Flashback Blast!" These consoles contain multiple games from different companies, such as Bandai Namco, Atari and Taito. Starting in 2019, the consoles included games licensed from Disney including Tron, The Jungle Book, The Lion King, and the Star Wars games.

In November 2019, AtGames released the 66-inch tall Legends Ultimate arcade cabinet, featuring 350 built-in licensed arcade games on a 24-inch HD screen. In December 2019, AtGames announced its ArcadeNet service, offering games on demand for streaming, download, and purchase on the Legends Ultimate arcade platform.

In August 2020, AtGames announced that the Legends Ultimate 1.1 would hit retail on August 31, 2020, featuring a library of 300 arcade titles from Atari, Data East, Jaleco, The Tetris Company, and Disney.

In September 2020, AtGames announced the Legends Gamer series of wireless arcade controllers, including the Legends Gamer Mini, Legends Gamer and Legends Gamer Pro. The Legends Gamer Mini comes with 100 classic arcade and home video games, while the Legends Gamer and Legends Gamer Pro come with 150 classic arcade and home video games including titles from Disney, Taito, and The Tetris Company.

See also 
 Sega Gopher, also known as the Sega Genesis Arcade Ultimate Portable Player

References

External links 
 
 

Companies based in Los Angeles
American companies established in 2001
Video game companies based in California